Lomatium suksdorfii (Suksdorf's desertparsley) is a perennial herb of the family Apiaceae that grows in Washington and Oregon, United States.

It is 50–200 cm tall, glabrous, caulescent, and has a taproot. It flowers from late March to May, with compound umbels of yellow flowers, each umbellule enclosed by thin bracts. The leaves have long petioles and are dissected into long, thin blades.

References

External links
USDA Plants Profile for Lomatium suksdorfii
WA.gov: Lomatium suksdorfii

suksdorfii
Flora of Oregon
Flora of Washington (state)
Endemic flora of the United States
Taxa named by John Merle Coulter
Flora without expected TNC conservation status